Michael Phelan (born 3 August 1967) is an Irish hurling manager and former player. At club level he played with Glenmore and was also a member of the Kilkenny senior hurling team. He usually lined out at midfield.

Career

Phelan first came to prominence at juvenile and underage levels with the Glenmore club before eventually joining the club's top adult team. He won a total of five County Senior Championship titles with the club and was at centre-forward for the All-Ireland Club Championship success in 1991. Phelan first appeared on the inter-county scene with the Kilkenny under-21 team that suffered All-Ireland final defeat by Cork in 1988. This success saw him drafted on to the Kilkenny senior hurling team in 1989. Phelan would go on to line out in three consecutive All-Ireland finals at senior level and, after defeat by Tipperary in 1991, claimed consecutive winners' medals against Cork in 1992 and Galway in 1993. His other honours include two National League titles, four Leinster Championship medals and an All-Star Award. Phelan's last major game with Kilkenny was the 1998 All-Ireland final defeat by Offaly when he was an unused substitute. He later became involved in team management and took charge of the Wicklow senior hurling team for the 2009 season.

Honours

Team

Glenmore
All-Ireland Senior Club Hurling Championship: 1991
Leinster Senior Club Hurling Championship: 1990, 1995
Kilkenny Senior Hurling Championship: 1987, 1990, 1992, 1995, 1999

Kilkenny
All-Ireland Senior Hurling Championship: 1992, 1993
Leinster Senior Hurling Championship: 1991, 1992, 1993, 1998, 1999
National Hurling League: 1989-90, 1994-95
Leinster Under-21 Hurling Championship: 1988

Leinster
Railway Cup: 1993

Individual

Awards
All-Star Award: 1992

References

1967 births
Living people
Glenmore hurlers
Kilkenny inter-county hurlers
Leinster inter-provincial hurlers
Hurling managers
All-Ireland Senior Hurling Championship winners